Thomas-Joseph Bouquillon (1840–1902) was a Belgian Catholic theologian and priest. He was the first professor of moral theology at the Catholic University of America and introduced social sciences into its curriculum. Regarded as a prominent Catholic theologian of his time, his contributions focus on theology, the history of theology, ecclesiastical history, canon law, and bibliography. 

Bouquillon was active and influential in the organization of the Catholic universities of Lille and Washington; he supported the views of Archbishop John Ireland and Edward McGlynn.

Life
Thomas-Joseph Bouquillon was born on 16 May 1840 in Warneton, Belgium. He was the second son of five children in a family of small landholders long established at Warneton. He received his early education at local schools and at the College of St Louis at Menin. He studied Philosophy at the Minor Seminary, Roeselare and theology at the seminary of Bruges.

Having entered the Georgian University in Rome in 1863, he was ordained as a priest in 1865 and made a doctor of theology in 1867. After ten years at the Bruges seminary (1867–77) and eight years at the Catholic University of Lille, France, as professor of moral theology, Bouquillon retired to the Benedictine monastery at Maredsous and devoted his energies to the preparation of the second edition of his treatise on fundamental moral theology.

In 1892 he accepted the chair of moral theology at the Catholic University of America in Washington, DC, where he remained until his death on November 5, 1902 in Brussels, Belgium.

Works

Though never in robust health, Bouquillon was a tireless student. When he entered the field of moral theology, he found the field enjoying no prestige, having dwindled to mere compilations of conclusions to the neglect of principles. It was out of touch, consequently, with the closely related dogmatic and advancing social sciences, and the methods employed in its teaching were far from perfect. In his whole career as a professor and author Bouquillon aimed to revive moral theology from its poor academic condition and to restore proper method and dignity in the field.

He emphasized the historical and sociological aspects of principles and problems in his field. Few theologians of his day were more widely consulted in Europe and America than Bouquillon. He enjoyed and retained the intimate confidence of Pope Leo XIII and of many eminent churchmen, and showed throughout his life devotion to the ideals, teaching, and administration of the Roman Catholic Church. His grasp of current thought developed in him an open-mindedness and a sympathy with real progress.

In 1891, he was induced to publish a pamphlet on education setting forth the abstract principles involved in contemporary moral theology. His views were met with considerable opposition. His works on education caused substantial controversy since he had supported the state's claims in the field. In all of his published replies to critics, he maintained his original positions without any modification whatever and ascribed the opposition to the misunderstanding of his point of view and of his statement of principles.

He published:

"Theologia Moralis Fundamentalis" (3d ed., Bruges, 1903)
 "De Virtutibus Theologicis" (2d ed. Bruges, 1890)
"De Virtute Religionis" (2 vols., Bruges, 1880);
"Education" (Baltimore, 1892)
"Education, a Rejoinder to Critics" (Baltimore, 1892)
"Education, a Rejoinder to the 'Civilatà Cattolica'" (Baltimore, 1892); the last three of these were translated into French

He published many critical studies in the Revue des sciences ecclésiastiques, of which he was at one time editor, in the Nouvelle revue théologique, the Revue Bénédictine, The American Catholic Quarterly, and The Catholic University Bulletin. He edited, with notes and comments:

Stapleton, "De Magnitudine Ecclesiæ Romanæ" (Bruges, 1881)
'Leonis XIII Allocutiones, Epistolæ aliaque acta" (2 vols., Bruges, 1887)
Platelii, "Synopsis cursus Theologiæ" (Bruges)
"Catechismus ex decreto Concilii Tridentini" (Tournai, 1890)
"Dies Sacerdotalis" of Dirckinck (Tournai, 1888)
Louis de Grenade, "L'Excellence de la très sainte Eucharistic" (Lille)
Coret, "L'Année sainte" (1676) (Bruges, 1889)

See also
 William J. Kerby

Notes

References

Footnotes

Bibliography

 
 
 
 This article incorporates text from this public-domain publication.

Further reading

External links
Biography at The American Catholic History Research Center

1840 births
1902 deaths
People from Comines-Warneton
Roman Catholic moral theologians
Thomists
19th-century Belgian Roman Catholic priests
19th-century Belgian Roman Catholic theologians
Belgian expatriates in the United States
Pontifical Gregorian University alumni
Catholic University of America School of Theology and Religious Studies faculty